Amiram Harten (1946 – 1994) was an American/Israeli applied mathematician. Harten made fundamental contribution to the development of high-resolution schemes for the solution of hyperbolic partial differential equations. Among other contributions, he developed the total variation diminishing scheme, which gives an oscillation free solution for flow with shocks.

In 1980s, Harten along with Björn Engquist, Stanley Osher, and Sukumar R. Chakravarthy developed the essentially non-oscillatory (ENO) schemes. The article on ENO, titled, Uniformly High Order Accurate Essentially Non-oscillatory Schemes, III was published in Journal of Computational Physics, in 1987 
and is one of the most cited papers in the field of scientific computing. It was republished in 1997 in the same journal. Harten is listed as an ISI highly cited researcher.

In 1990 Harten gave a talk on "Recent developments in shock-capturing schemes" at the International Congress of Mathematicians in Kyoto.

References

External links

20th-century Israeli mathematicians
20th-century Israeli Jews
American people of Israeli descent
New York University alumni
Numerical analysts
University of California, Los Angeles faculty
Academic staff of Tel Aviv University
1946 births
1994 deaths